Cars is a media franchise including the 2006 film Cars, the 2011 film Cars 2, the 2017 film Cars 3, the 2022 series Cars on the Road, the 2013 film Planes and the 2014 film Planes: Fire & Rescue. This page is a list of characters that have appeared in the franchise.

Piston Cup teams

Rust-eze team
Montgomery "Lightning" McQueen (voiced by Owen Wilson in the films and the first two games, Ben Rausch in Cars 3: Driven to Win, Keith Ferguson in all other media) is not modeled directly after a specific make and model, although his design contains some elements inspired by the Chevrolet Corvette C6, Dodge Viper (ZB I), and Gen 4 NASCAR stock cars. He owns a racing academy team with Doc Hudson called the "Doc Hudson Racing Academy" (later known as the "Lightning McQueen Racing Academy" after Hudson's passing), where he trains rookie racers in the act of speed and good sportsmanship. Together with his friends, Cruz Ramirez and Mater, McQueen's academy is a popular racing school in the world of Cars. Throughout his career, he has recorded seven Piston Cup championships and hasn't recorded a DNF, until the third film, when he crashed out in the form of a rollover in an effort to close the gap to Jackson Storm, his high-tech next generation rival.
 (voiced by John Ratzenberger) is a 1985 Mack Super-Liner. Has the role of McQueen's transport, Mack pulls Lightning McQueen's trailer to his races. McQueen exhorts Mack to drive through the night to his tiebreaker race with Chick Hicks and The King in Los Angeles, despite federal DOT regulations which legally grant Mack ten hours daily of much-needed off-duty rest alongside "all those sleeping trucks" at the last truck stop on I-40. As a result, Mack falls asleep and, distracted by the Delinquent Road Hazards who attempt to push him off the road to the shoulder, loses Lightning. Mack arrives in Radiator Springs after Hudson reveals Lightning's location.

Sterling (voiced by Nathan Fillion) is a billionaire and one of the main antagonists in Cars 3. He assigns Cruz Ramirez to train McQueen and prepare him for the Florida 500. After watching McQueen's poor performance on the simulator, Sterling attempted to convince McQueen to retire and become a racing brand. McQueen convinces him to give him a chance at winning the Florida 500, then McQueen could decide when to stop racing to which Sterling reluctantly agrees.
Cruz Ramirez (voiced by Cristela Alonzo) is Lightning McQueen's trainer and technician at the Rust-eze Racing Center. She is known for training some of the best newer elite rookies through her unconventional training methods. She is assigned to train McQueen for the Florida 500. Cruz and McQueen later head to Thomasville where they meet Hudson's former crew chief, Smokey. Smokey trains McQueen and inspires Cruz as well. At the Florida 500, Cruz is sent back to the Racing Center. McQueen exits the race to allow Cruz to race. Using what she's learned on the road, Cruz catches up to Jackson Storm, who tries to overtake her. However, Cruz flips over him and lands in first place. She returned in Cars 3: Driven to Win as one of the main characters and a starting playable character along with McQueen, Mater, Sally, Ramone and Guido.

Dinoco team

 (voiced by Richard Petty) is a "Dinoco-blue" veteran race car and racing legend. Weathers is an anthropomorphic version of Petty's aerodynamic 1970 Plymouth Superbird, sporting same shade of blue and Petty's race car number, 43 and is also a fictionalized version of him. He is one of the race cars in the 2005 Piston Cup three-way tie, along with Chick Hicks and Lightning McQueen. He is Dinoco's "Golden Boy", having won seven Piston Cups, and is hoping for his eighth in the tiebreaker race before entering retirement so he can spend more time with his wife. He returns in Cars 3 as the crew chief of his nephew and new Dinoco racer Cal Weathers.

HTB team
 (voiced by Michael Keaton in Cars, the video game adaption, and Cars Race-O-Rama, Bob Peterson in Cars 3) is Lightning McQueen's primary rival in the first film. He returns in Cars 3, being voiced by Bob Peterson due to Keaton's scheduling conflicts with Spider-Man: Homecoming. In this film, he now hosts his own talk show, Chick's Picks on Racing Sports Network. Chick returns in the Cars video game, which is written by Pixar and considered a continuation to the story started in the movie. Despite the fact he did not appear in Cars 2, he does show up in the film's video game as a downloadable character for the Xbox 360 and PlayStation 3 editions. He also appears in Disney Infinity. He also appears in Cars 3: Driven to Win, where he conducts post-race interviews with Mater, Smokey, Natalie Certain, and Miss Fritter; as well as giving out racing news offering commentary about players' winning/losing performance.

IGNTR team
 (voiced by Armie Hammer in the film, AJ Hamilton in Cars 3: Driven to Win) is an arrogant blue-and-black "next generation" Piston Cup racer, is a newer rookie that comes into the racing sport, and one of the rivals in the third installment in the franchise. At the Florida 500, he is overtaken by McQueen's former trainer Cruz Ramirez. He attempts to make her lose focus by telling her that she doesn't belong on a track. Cruz, however, regains her confidence and drives up next to Storm, who rammed her into the SAFER barrier wall, but Cruz flips over him and lands.

Radiator Springs
These characters live in Radiator Springs with Lightning McQueen, his trainer Cruz Ramirez and their hauler, Mack.

Mater (voiced by Larry the Cable Guy) is a rusty tow truck, resembling a 1957 Chevrolet Task Force. He is McQueen's best friend, and Holley Shiftwell's boyfriend. For his heroic actions in exposing Miles Axlerod during the London leg of the World Grand Prix, Mater receives an honorary knighthood from the Queen, for which he is now known as "Sir Tow Mater".
Sally Carrera (voiced by Bonnie Hunt) is the town's attorney. She is a 2002 Porsche 996 Carrera. In 2022, Porsche made a one-off Porsche 911 as a tribute to the character, referred to as the "Sally Special". 

Doc Hudson (voiced by Paul Newman in the first film and its video game adaptation, Corey Burton in all other related media) was the town's medical doctor, judge, and Lightning McQueen's mentor/crew chief. He was based on the 1951 Hudson Hornet. He did not appear in the second film due to Paul Newman's death, and it is implied that he died as well at some point in between films. He appeared in Cars 3 in McQueen's flashbacks, being voiced by archival recordings of Newman. He won three consecutive Piston Cups in 1951, 1952 and 1953 as a racer known as The Fabulous Hudson Hornet, and still held the record for the most wins in a single racing season with Smokey as his crew chief, corresponding to the first three of the real-life Hornet's production years.

The  (voiced by Michael Wallis) is a 1949 Mercury Eight Police Cruiser police car,. Sheriff is painted in the classic law enforcement black and white with a single red light dome, two sirens, and curb feelers. Sheriff was the first resident of Radiator Springs to appear in the original film and the first to meet Lightning McQueen during a police chase when McQueen was speeding through the town, attempting to locate Mack.  Sheriff reappears in Cars 2, seeing Lightning and his race crew off to the World Grand Prix. During the climax of the film, Sheriff arrives with the other Radiator Springs residents as new members of McQueen's pit crew in England, and is informed by Mater of the Lemons cars' plot to kill McQueen in order to turn all vehicles in the world against alternate energy and rely on gasoline for profit.

Luigi (voiced by Tony Shalhoub in the films and video games, Michael Shalhoub in Disney Infinity) and Guido (voiced by Guido Quaroni) are part of McQueen's pit crew. Luigi is a 1959 Fiat 500. Luigi owns a tire shop, Casa Della Tires, which is known for its "Leaning Tower of Tires", a tower of several tires shaped like the Leaning Tower of Pisa. Both are Scuderia Ferrari fans.

 (voiced by Cheech Marin in the films and video games, Milton James in Cars 3: Driven to Win) is a 1959 Chevrolet Impala coupé lowrider that owns the Ramone's House of Body Art store, where he paints himself and other cars, including Lightning McQueen later in the film. His garage employs the distinctive architecture of the Tower Station (U-Drop Inn) in Shamrock, Texas.
 Flo (voiced by Jenifer Lewis) is the owner of Radiator Springs only gas diner, "Flo's V-8 Café", and is married to Ramone. She appears to be inspired by two early- to mid-1950s show cars: the 1951 Buick XP-300 (side trim), 1951 General Motors Le Sabre and the 1957 Chrysler Dart concept car (front view) or 1960 Chrysler 300F 2 doors hardtop custom (cockpit, deck lid, and big tailfins rear).

 (based on Route 66 artist Bob Waldmire and voiced by George Carlin in Cars, the video game, and Cars Toons (via archival recordings), Brian George in Cars Mater-National Championship, Mark Silverman in Cars Race-O-Rama, Lloyd Sherr in all other media after the first film due to Carlin's death) is a Volkswagen Type 2 microbus of early 1960s vintage as evidenced by his pointed front turn signals and small rear window. He is a stereotypical hippie, as he has stickers of the peace sign and flowers with his license plate positioned to resemble a soul patch.
 (voiced by Katherine Helmond) is a 1924 Ford Model T Coupe, the widow of Radiator Springs' founder Stanley, and the elderly owner of a roadside souvenir and accessory shop.

Cars 2
These are characters who have first or only appeared in the film Cars 2 (2011).

Secret agents and spies
 (voiced by Michael Caine in the second film, Martin Jarvis in the video games) is a British secret agent who recruits Mater to help in his mission. His small tail fins were inspired by a 1958 British sports car called the Peerless—one of the few British cars with fins. His suspicions about the World Grand Prix turn out to be correct, as the event was revealed to be a cover-up by Miles Axlerod to turn the world against alternative fuels.
 (voiced by Emily Mortimer) is a British spy-in-training, and Mater's love interest.
The Lemons are international criminals that appear in Cars 2.
 (voiced by Eddie Izzard) is the main antagonist of the second film. Axlerod created the World Grand Prix to promote his new biofuel, Allinol. His "alternative fuel" is, in actuality, ordinary gasoline engineered to ignite if hit with electromagnetic pulses from generators disguised as television cameras. Axlerod planned to use Professor Zündapp and the lemon cars to kill McQueen in the final race, but the EMP weapon fails to finish him off because Sarge had switched McQueen's Allinol for Fillmore's organic fuel before the start of the race.
 (often referred simply as Professor Z) (voiced by Thomas Kretschmann) is an internationally wanted weapon designer. Though he initially appears to be the main antagonist, he is eventually revealed to be the central antagonist, and subordinate to Miles Axlerod.

World Grand Prix
 (voiced by John Turturro in Cars 2 and Cars 2: The Video Game, and Roger Craig Smith in Disney Infinity) serves as Lightning McQueen's primary racing rival in the second film. He is painted in colors similar to the Italian flag.

Cars 3

These are characters who have first or only appeared in the film Cars 3 (2017).

Miss Fritter (voiced by Lea Delaria) is a villainous demolition derby-inspired school bus with 4x4 jacked up wheels, with some elements from the 1970 International S Series and the Ford B series, with various license plates hanging down her left side, smoke stacks of doom that release fire and her race number 58 on her sides, and a main Antagonist in the third film as well. She is Lightning McQueen's nemesis, an undefeated Crazy-8 champion in the movie. She appears at a demolition derby at Thunder Hollow Speedway. She nearly saws Cruz with her Stop sign saw blades until Lightning McQueen, disguised as Chester Whipplefilter stops her only to get his tire shredded because the saw was lodged between his rear fender and tire. Cruz Ramirez ends up winning the race. At the end, Miss Fritter is serving as a turn friended big fan of Lightning McQueen and she was very happy to see him after his disguise came out. Miss Fritter is then seen cheering for McQueen and Cruz, watching the Florida 500 on TV. Then she appeared in a Cars 3 short film "Miss Fritter's Racing Skoool" shooting a commercial for demolition derby racing along with her friends from Thunder Hollow. She returned in "Cars 3: Driven to Win" as an unlockable playable character and the first Master Event Boss Character. She is unlocked by completing and defeating her in the Master-level event, Miss Fritter Battle Race. She also chased Jackson Storm, an arrogant Next-Gen Piston Cup racer determined to beat anyone anywhere, at Thunder Hollow after the player beats him to the finish in the master-level event, Jackson Storm Race.

Planes

 Dusty Crophopper (voiced by Dane Cook) was inspired by the Air Tractor AT-502, Cessna and the PZL-Mielec M-18 Dromader. He is painted white and orange with some black stripes. After his training, he has the black Jolly Wrenches insignia Skipper earned him up front as well as "D7" on his rudder. Since the Germany leg in the WATG rally, he gained blue racing stripes and the number 7 in a white circle on his body and wings. After becoming severely damaged en route to Mexico in the storm, most Wings Around The Globe racers gave him new parts as well as gaining T-33 Shooting Star wings and a Skyslicer MK V propeller. At the end of the film, he has a Jolly Wrenches paint job while racing with Skipper, having been made an honorary Jolly Wrench.
 Skipper Riley (voiced by Stacy Keach) is a Vought F4U Corsair and Dusty's mentor. His sole mission was a routine patrol that turned disastrous when his squadron stumbled upon an enemy fleet, leaving him as the sole survivor.
 Sparky (voiced by Danny Mann) is a forklift and good friend of Chug and Skipper's assistant and mechanic.
 Ishani (voiced by Priyanka Chopra) is a Pan-Asian champion from India, based on the AeroCad AeroCanard with over a billion racing fans. She's painted orange and yellow with the number 6 in green. She is Dusty's good friend and Ripslinger's hated rival and former ally and teammate.
 Chug (voiced by Brad Garrett) is a fuel truck and Dusty's best friend.
 Dottie (voiced by Teri Hatcher) is a forklift and Dusty's friend and mechanic. 
 Leadbottom (voiced by Cedric the Entertainer) is a biplane inspired by the Boeing-Stearman Model 75 with a partial engine cowl.
 Rochelle (voiced by Julia Louis-Dreyfus) is a racing plane from Canada inspired by the Bay Super V, a conversion of the V-tail Model 35 Beechcraft Bonanza painted pink and white with some red maple leaf designs and the number 22. Originally from Quebec, her flag and paint job is localized in 11 countries. She is also El Chupacabra's girlfriend. In Australia and New Zealand, Rochelle is re-contextualized as a former Tasmanian mail delivery plane, and is voiced by Jessica Marais.
 Ripslinger (voiced by Roger Craig Smith) is a custom-built carbon-fiber race plane with green decals, orange flame designs, several racing sponsors and his name painted on his body and wings. He also has a four bladed contra-rotating propeller. Rip is captain of Team RPX and Dusty's hated rival in the film. His race number is 13. He later damaged Skipper's vertical stabilizer during the Mexico-New York leg. He returned as a main antagonist for Planes: the Video Game attempting to ruin Dusty's fame, wreck his town, paint Dusty graffiti on the Great Wall of China while disguised as him, and even cause trouble for Dusty's international friends including ruining the Diwali Festival in Ishani's home country. 
 Ned and Zed (voiced by Gabriel Iglesias) are henchmen of Ripslinger and his teammates inspired by the Zivko Edge 540 and MX Aircraft MXS. Ned is green with white wings and the number 0 in orange, while Zed is white with green wings and the number 00 in orange. They are twin brothers from New Zealand (They represent the United States with Ripslinger in the film) who try to sabotage the other racers by flying aggressively (this was best demonstrated when they cut off Dusty's antenna, forcing him to land on the USS Dwight D. Flysenhower), allowing Ripslinger to take the win with Ned and Zed finishing second and third. They were later thwarted by Dusty when Ned hit a rock with his left wing, sending him into a barrel roll and trapping both him and Zed into a narrow gap that only Dusty was able to fly through.                          
El Chupacabra (voiced by Carlos Alazraqui is a red, white and green Gee Bee Model R and Dusty's good friend and Rochelle's boyfriend. He is racer number 5 from Mexico.

Planes: Fire & Rescue

 Lil' Dipper (voiced by Julie Bowen) is a Super Scooper based on the Grumman G-21 Goose and C-415 SuperScooper She is also Dusty's biggest fan and love interest.
 Maru (voiced by Curtis Armstrong) is a forklift mechanic at the Piston Peak Air Attack base.
 Blade Ranger (voiced by Ed Harris) is a veteran fire-and-rescue helicopter. He used to play a police helicopter in CHoPs with Nick "Loop'n" Lopez but became a firefighter when Nick died. Blade is inspired by the AgustaWestland AW109, AgustaWestland AW139. and Bell 429 GlobalRanger
 Windlifter (voiced by Wes Studi is a Sikorsky S-64 Skycrane heavy-lift helicopter who used to work as a lumberjack before Planes 2.
 Cabbie (voiced by Dale Dye) is a Fairchild C-119 Flying Boxcar retired from military service who airdrops the Smokejumpers to fire sites.
 Dynamite (voiced by Regina King) is the leader of The Smokejumpers, a team of ground vehicles which parachute into fire sites.
 Pinecone (voiced by Corri English is a smokejumper equipped with a rake tool to clear brush and debris.
 Avalanche (voiced by Bryan Callen) is a bulldozer and a smokejumper.
 Blackout (voiced by Danny Pardo) is a smokejumper equipped with a circular saw.
 Drip (voiced by Matt L. Jones) is a smokejumper equipped with a skid-steer claw to clear fallen trees and brush.
 Secretary of the Interior (voiced by Fred Willard) is a green four-wheel-drive with a roof rack.
 Harvey (voiced by Jerry Stiller) is an RV and Winnie's husband.
 Winnie (voiced by Anne Meara) is an RV and Harvey's wife.
 Nick "Loop'n" Lopez (voiced by Erik Estrada) is a helicopter TV actor who was the co-star of CHoPs. He was killed during filming of the series' one-hundred-thirty-ninth episode, and is the reason Blade became a firefighter (Blade couldn't save him in time).
 Ol' Jammer (voiced by Barry Corbin) is a tour bus at Piston Peak. He later was promoted as superintendent after Cad was fired from his selfishness.
 Mayday (voiced by Hal Holbrook) is an old fire and rescue truck from Propwash Junction.
 Ryker (voiced by Kevin Michael Richardson) is a transportation management safety truck with a roof-mounted water cannon for firefighting.
 Pulaski (voiced by Patrick Warburton) is a structural firefighting fire truck at Piston Peak with a roof-mounted water cannon for firefighting. Pulaski's namesake, Ed Pulaski, was known for his heroism in saving most of his crew during the Great Fire of 1910 by sheltering in an abandoned mine.

References

External links

 
Lists of Disney animated film characters
Fictional racing cars